ExxonMobil Corporation (commonly shortened to Exxon) is an American multinational oil and gas corporation headquartered in Spring, Texas, United States. It is the largest direct descendant of John D. Rockefeller's Standard Oil, and was formed on November 30, 1999, by the merger of Exxon and Mobil, both of which are used as retail brands, alongside Esso, for fueling stations and downstream products today. The company is vertically integrated across the entire oil and gas industry, and within it is also a chemicals division which produces plastic, synthetic rubber, and other chemical products. ExxonMobil is incorporated in New Jersey.

ExxonMobil's earliest corporate ancestor was Vacuum Oil Company, though Standard Oil is its largest ancestor prior to its breakup. The entity today known as ExxonMobil grew out of the Standard Oil Company of New Jersey (or Jersey Standard for short), the corporate entity which effectively controlled all of Standard Oil prior to its breakup. Jersey Standard grew alongside and with extensive partnership another Standard Oil descendant and its future merger partner, the Standard Oil Company of New York (Socony), both of which grew bigger by merging with various third companies like Humble Oil (which merged with Jersey Standard) and Vacuum Oil (merged with Socony). Both companies underwent rebranding in the 1960s and early 1970s, and by the time of the 1999 merger, Jersey Standard had been known as Exxon, and Socony known as Mobil. The merger agreement between Exxon and Mobil stipulated that Exxon would buy Mobil and rebrand as ExxonMobil, with Mobil's CEO becoming the vice-chairman of the company.

One of the world's largest companies by revenue, ExxonMobil since its merger varied from the first to tenth largest publicly traded company by revenue, and has one of the largest market capitalizations out of any company. As of 2022, in the most recent rankings released in the Fortune 500, ExxonMobil was ranked sixth, and twelfth on the Fortune Global 500. ExxonMobil is the largest investor-owned oil company in the world, the largest oil company headquartered in the Western world, and the largest of the Big Oil companies in both production and market value. ExxonMobil's reserves were 20 billion BOE at the end of 2016 and the 2007 rates of production were expected to last more than 14 years. Approximately 55.56% of the company's shares are held by institutions, the largest of which as of 2019 were The Vanguard Group (8.15%), BlackRock (6.61%), and State Street Corporation (4.83%).

ExxonMobil has been widely criticized, mostly for environmental incidents and its history of climate change denial against the scientific consensus that fossil fuels significantly contribute to global warming. The company is responsible for many oil spills, the largest and most notable of which was the Exxon Valdez oil spill in Alaska, considered to be one of the world's worst oil spills in terms of damage to the environment. The company has also been the target of accusations of human rights violations, excessive influence on America's foreign policy, and its impact on various societies across the world.

History

ExxonMobil traces its roots to Vacuum Oil Company, founded in the 1860s. Vacuum Oil later merged with the Standard Oil Company of New York, which later changed its name to Mobil and merged with Exxon (originally the Standard Oil Company of New Jersey) in 1999.

With the merger, the two companies practically merged, with the new company's name containing both of the trade names of its immediate predecessors. However, the structure of the merger provided that Exxon was the surviving company, rather than a new company being created.

Operations
ExxonMobil is the largest non-government-owned company in the energy industry and produces about 3% of the world's oil and about 2% of the world's energy.

ExxonMobil is vertically integrated into a number of global operating divisions. These divisions are grouped into three categories for reference purposes, though the company also has several standalone divisions, such as Coal & Minerals. It also owns hundreds of smaller subsidiaries such as XTO Energy and SeaRiver Maritime. ExxonMobil also has a majority ownership stake in Imperial Oil.

 Upstream (oil exploration, extraction, shipping, and wholesale operations)
 Product Solutions (downstream, chemical)
 Low Carbon Solutions

Upstream
The upstream division makes up the majority of ExxonMobil's revenue, accounting for approximately 70% of it. In 2021, ExxonMobil had about 30 billion barrels of oil and oil equivalents, as well as 38.1 billion cubic feet of natural gas.

In the United States, ExxonMobil's petroleum exploration and production activities are concentrated in the Permian Basin, Bakken Formation, Woodford Shale, Caney Shale, and the Gulf of Mexico. In addition, ExxonMobil has several gas developments in the regions of Marcellus Shale, Utica Shale, Haynesville Shale, Barnett Shale, and Fayetteville Shale. All natural gas activities are conducted by its subsidiary, XTO Energy. In California, it has a joint venture called Aera Energy LLC with Shell Oil.

In addition, ExxonMobil plans to start exploration activities off the coast of Liberia and the Ivory Coast. In the past, ExxonMobil had exploration activities in Madagascar, however these operations were ended due to unsatisfactory results.

Until the 2022 Russian invasion of Ukraine, ExxonMobil held  in the Sakhalin-I project through its subsidiary Exxon Neftegas. Together with Rosneft, it has developed  in Russia, including the East-Prinovozemelsky field. It also operates the Longford Gas Conditioning Plant, and participates in the development of Gorgon LNG project. In Papua New Guinea, it holds , including the PNG Gas project. After Russia's 2022 invasion began, though, ExxonMobil announced it was fully pulling out of both Russia and Sakhalin-I, and launched a lawsuit against Russia's federal government on August 30.

Product Solutions 
ExxonMobil formed its Product Solutions division in 2022, combining its previously separate Downstream and Chemical divisions into a single company.

Downstream and Retail 
ExxonMobil markets products around the world under the brands of Exxon, Mobil, and Esso. Mobil is ExxonMobil's primary retail gasoline brand in California, Florida, New York, New England, the Great Lakes, and the Midwest. Exxon is the primary brand in the rest of the United States, with the highest concentration of retail outlets located in New Jersey, Pennsylvania, Texas (shared with Mobil), and in the Mid-Atlantic and Southeastern states. ExxonMobil has stations in 46 states, just behind Shell USA and ahead of Phillips 66, lacking a presence only in Alaska, Hawaii, Iowa, and Kansas.

Outside of the United States, Esso and Mobil are primarily used, with Esso operating in 14 countries and Mobil operating in 29 countries and regions.

In Japan, ExxonMobil had a 22% stake in TonenGeneral Sekiyu K.K., a refining company which merged into Eneos in 2017.

ExxonMobil's primary retail brands worldwide are Exxon, Esso, Mobil, with the former being used exclusively in the United States and the latter two being used in most other countries where ExxonMobil operates. Esso is the only one of its brands not used widely in the United States. Since 2018, ExxonMobil has operated a loyalty program, ExxonMobil Rewards+, where customers earn rewards points when filling up at its stations in the United States and later the United Kingdom.

Chemicals 

ExxonMobil Chemical is a petrochemical company that was created by merging Exxon's and Mobil's chemical industries. Its principal products include basic olefins and aromatics, ethylene glycol, polyethylene, and polypropylene along with speciality lines such as elastomers, plasticizers, solvents, process fluids, oxo alcohols and adhesive resins. The company also produces synthetic lubricant base stocks as well as lubricant additives, propylene packaging films and catalysts. ExxonMobil is the largest producer of butyl rubber. Infineum, a joint venture with Shell plc, is manufacturing and marketing crankcase lubricant additives, fuel additives, and specialty lubricant additives, as well as automatic transmission fluids, gear oils, and industrial oils.

Sponsorships 

Mobil 1, a brand of synthetic motor oil, is a major sponsor of multiple racing teams and as the official motor oil of NASCAR since 2003. ExxonMobil is currently in partnerships with Oracle Red Bull Racing in Formula One and Kalitta Motorsports.

Refineries 
ExxonMobil operates 21 refineries worldwide, and the company claims 80% of its refining capacity is integrated with chemical or lube basestocks. ExxonMobil's largest refinery in the United States is its Baytown Refinery, located in Baytown, Texas, and its largest refinery overall is its Jurong Island facility in Singapore; these two refineries combined output over 1.15 million barrels of oil per day. In 2021, ExxonMobil's global average refining capacity was 4.6 million barrels per day, with the United States producing a plurality of the company's refining capacity at about 1.77 million barrels per day. ExxonMobil's corporate website claims it refines almost 5 million barrels per day.

Low Carbon Solutions
Officially formed with ExxonMobil's 2022 corporate restructuring, and currently led by former General Motors president Dan Ammann, Low Carbon Solutions is the company's alternative energy division. The division intends to lower emissions in hard-to-decarbonize sectors such as heavy industry, commercial transportation, and power generation using a combination of lower-emission fuels, hydrogen, and carbon capture and storage. Low Carbon Solutions conducts research on clean energy technologies, including algae biofuels, biodiesel made from agricultural waste, carbonate fuel cells, and refining crude oil into plastic by using a membrane and osmosis instead of heat.

ExxonMobil publicly announced it would be investing $15 billion in what it deemed a "lower carbon future", and claims to be the world leader in carbon capture and storage. The company additionally plans that its Scope 1 and Scope 2 emissions will be carbon neutral by 2050. ExxonMobil additionally acquired biofuel company Biojet AS in 2022, and its Canadian subsidiary Imperial Oil is moving ahead with plans to produce a renewable diesel biofuel.

Corporate affairs

Financial data
According to Fortune Global 500, ExxonMobil was the second largest company, second largest publicly held corporation, and the largest oil company in the United States by 2017 revenue. For the fiscal year 2020, ExxonMobil reported a loss of US$22.4 billion, with an annual revenue of US$181.5 billion, a decline of 31.5% over the previous fiscal cycle.

Headquarters and offices

ExxonMobil's headquarters are located in Spring, Texas, a suburb of Houston.

The company decided to consolidate its Houston operations into one new campus located in northern Harris County and vacating its offices on 800 Bell St. which it occupied since 1963. This includes twenty office buildings totaling , a wellness center, laboratory, and three parking garages. It is designed to house nearly 10,000 employees with an additional 1,500 employees located in a satellite campus in Hughes Landing in The Woodlands, Texas.

Board of directors
The current chairman of the board and CEO of ExxonMobil Corp. is Darren W. Woods. Woods was elected chairman of the board and CEO effective January 1, 2017, after the retirement of former chairman and CEO Rex Tillerson. Before his election as chairman and CEO, Woods was elected president of ExxonMobil and a member of the board of directors in 2016.

, the current ExxonMobil board members are:
 Michael J. Angelakis, chair and chief executive officer of Atairos Group Inc.
 Susan Avery, president emerita of Woods Hole Oceanographic Institution 
 Angela Braly, former president and CEO of WellPoint (now Anthem)
 Ursula Burns, former chair and CEO of Xerox
 Gregory J. Goff, former executive vice chair, Marathon Petroleum 
 Kaisa H. Hietala, board professional
 Joseph L. Hooley, former chair, president and CEO of State Street 
 Steven A. Kandarian, chair, president and CEO of MetLife
 Alexander A. Karsner, senior strategist at X Development
 Jeffrey W. Ubben, Founder, Portfolio Manager, and Managing Partner, Inclusive Capital Partners, L.P.
 Darren W. Woods, chair of the board and CEO, ExxonMobil Corporation
Hooley is presently the lead independent director, having succeeded former Merck CEO Kenneth Frazier upon his retirement in May 2022. Three of the directors nominated at the last Annual General Meeting were nominated after a proxy battle against hedge fund Engine No.1 and were nominated against the suggestion of the board.

Key Executives
ExxonMobil's key executives are:
Darren Woods, chairman and CEO
Neil Chapman, Senior Vice President
Kathryn Mikells, CFO and Senior Vice President
Jack Williams, Senior Vice President
James Spellings, General Tax Counsel and Vice President

Controversies

Climate change denial 

ExxonMobil's environmental record has faced much criticism for its stance and impact on global warming. In 2018, the Political Economy Research Institute ranks ExxonMobil tenth among American corporations emitting airborne pollutants, thirteenth by emitting greenhouse gases, and sixteenth by emitting water pollutants. A 2017 report places ExxonMobil as the fifth largest contributor to greenhouse gas emissions from 1988 to 2015., ExxonMobil had committed less than 1% of their profits towards researching alternative energy, which, according to the advocacy organization Ceres, is less than other leading oil companies. According to the 2021 Arctic Environmental Responsibility Index (AERI), ExxonMobil is ranked as the sixth most environmentally responsible company among 120 oil, gas, and mining companies involved in resource extraction north of the Arctic Circle. The company's activities gained international notoriety from many incidents, most notably the Exxon Valdez oil spill in 1989. As of 2020, ExxonMobil has been responsible for more than 3,000 oil spills and leakages which resulted in a loss of more than one barrel of oil, with the most in a single year being 484 spills in 2011. Additionally, since 1965, ExxonMobil has released more than 40 billion tons of carbon dioxide pollution.

In 2023, Science journal published a paper reporting that the global warming projections documented by and the models created by ExxonMobil's own scientists between 1977 and 2003 had "accurately" projected and "skillfully" modeled global warming due to fossil fuel burning, and had reasonably estimated how much CO2 would lead to dangerous warming. The authors of the paper concluded: "Yet, whereas academic and government scientists worked to communicate what they knew to the public, ExxonMobil worked to deny it."

Between the 1980s and 2014, ExxonMobil was a notable denier of climate change, though the company officially changed its position in 2014 to acknowledge the existence of climate change. ExxonMobil's prolonged response incited the creation of the Exxon Knew movement, which aims to hold the company accountable for various climate-related incidents. ExxonMobil has used its own website to attack Exxon Knew, claiming that it is a coordinated effort to defame the company.

Oil spills 
ExxonMobil's operations have been subject to numerous oil spills both before and after the 1999 merger. The most widely publicized oil spill was the 1989 Valdez oil spill, where an Exxon tanker discharged approximately of oil into Prince William Sound, oiling  of the remote Alaskan coastline. The spill remains the second largest in American history, only trailing BP's Deepwater Horizon spill in the Gulf of Mexico.

ExxonMobil was also responsible for various other oil spills across the world. Some of Exxon's largest and most notable oil spills in the United States include long-lasting oil leaks totaling into an estimated 30 million gallon spill into New York City's Newtown Creek over the course of a century by Exxon and other Standard Oil predecessors, a 2011 oil spill which leaked 1,500 barrels of oil into the Yellowstone River (resulting in about $135 million in damages), and a 2012 1,900 barrel (80,000 gallon) spill from the company's Baton Rouge Refinery in the rivers of Point Coupee Parish, Louisiana. ExxonMobil's actives in Louisiana in particular, especially its Baton Rouge Refinery, have given the area the nickname of Cancer Alley. The company's activities, along with other operations and refineries in the area, have been the source of increased cancer infections, lower air quality, and as seen by some, potential environmental racism committed by the company.

Human rights violations in Indonesia 

Beginning in the late 1980s, ExxonMobil (through predecessor Mobil) hired military units of the Indonesian National Army to provide security for their gas extraction and liquefaction project in Aceh, Indonesia, with the military units being accused of committing human rights violations. ExxonMobil eventually pulled out completely of Indonesia in 2001, though the company denies any wrongdoing.

Geopolitical influence 
The company has also been accused of human rights violations and abusing its geopolitical influence. In the book Private Empire by Steve Coll, ExxonMobil is described as extremely powerful "corporate state within the American state" in dealing with the countries in which it drills, going to the point as describing such countries' governments as "constrained". The company's corporate ancestors are also blamed for the outbreak of the 1954 Jebel Akhdar War, which was sparked by the Iraq Petroleum Company's activities.

Other controversies 
During a 2022 surge in profits among ExxonMobil and other large oil companies, partly due to the war in Ukraine, US President Joe Biden has criticized ExxonMobil specifically, and in June amidst record oil prices, stated that "Exxon made more money than God this year". CNN ran a headline amidst the oil giant reporting its second quarter earnings in 2022, calculating that Exxon made $2,245.62 USD per second in profit across the 92-day long second quarter.

See also
 Esso
 History of ExxonMobil
 Litigation involving ExxonMobil:
 Connecticut v. ExxonMobil
 Exxon Corp. v Exxon Insurance Consultants International Ltd
 Kivalina v. ExxonMobil
 People of the State of New York v. ExxonMobil

Notes

References

Bibliography

 Form 10-K 2018: 
 Form 10-K 2022: 
 Bender, Rob, and Tammy Cannoy-Bender. An Unauthorized Guide to: Mobil Collectibles – Chasing the Red Horse. Atglen, Pennsylvania: Schiffer Publishing Co., 1999.
 Exxon Corp. Century of Discovery: An Exxon Album. 1982.
 Gibb, George S., and Evelyn H. Knowlton. The Resurgent Years, 1911–1927: History of Standard Oil Co. (New Jersey). New York: Harper & Brothers Publishers, 1956.
 Hidy, Ralph W., and Muriel E. Hidy. Pioneering in Big Business, 1882–1911: History of Standard Oil Co. (New Jersey). New York: Harper & Brothers Publishers, 1955.
 Larson, Henrietta M., and Kenneth Wiggins Porter. History of Humble Oil & Refining Co.: A Study in Industrial Growth. New York: Harper & Brothers Publishers, 1959.
 Larson, Henrietta M., Evelyn H. Knowlton, and Charles S. Popple. New Horizons, 1927–1950: History of Standard Oil Co. (New Jersey). New York: Harper & Row, 1971.
 McIntyre, J. Sam. The Esso Collectibles Handbook: Memorabilia from Standard Oil of New Jersey. Atglen, Pennsylvania: Schiffer Publishing Co., 1998.
 Sampson, Anthony. The Seven Sisters: The 100-year Battle for the World's Oil Supply. New York: Bantom Books, 1991.
 Standard Oil Co. (New Jersey). Ships of the Esso Fleet in World War II. 1946.
 Tarbell, Ida M. All in a Day's Work: An Autobiography.. New York: The MacMillan Co., 1939.
 Tarbell, Ida M., and David Mark Chalmers. The History of the Standard Oil Co.. New York: Harper & Row, 1966.
 Wall, Bennett H. Growth in a Changing Environment: A History of Standard Oil Co. (New Jersey) 1950–1972 and Exxon Corp. (1972–1975). New York: McGraw-Hill Book Co., 1988.
 Yergin, Daniel. The Prize: The Epic Quest for Oil, Money, and Power. New York: Simon & Schuster, 1991.

Further reading

External links

 
 The ExxonMobil Historical Collection at the Dolph Briscoe Center for American History at the University of Texas

Exxon Mobil Lobbying Profile – Opensecrets.org

 
Oil companies of the United States
American brands
Automotive fuel retailers
Chemical companies of the United States
Multinational companies headquartered in the United States
Multinational oil companies
Natural gas companies of the United States
Rockefeller family
Standard Oil
Companies based in Irving, Texas
Petroleum in Texas
American companies established in 1911
Energy companies established in 1911
Non-renewable resource companies established in 1911
Retail companies established in 1911
1911 establishments in New Jersey
American companies established in 1999
Energy companies established in 1999
Non-renewable resource companies established in 1999
1999 establishments in Texas
Former components of the Dow Jones Industrial Average
Companies listed on the New York Stock Exchange
Climate change denial